Haliotis supertexta is a species of sea snail, a marine gastropod mollusk in the family Haliotidae, the abalones.

Description

Distribution

References

 Geiger D.L. & Owen B. (2012) Abalone: Worldwide Haliotidae. Hackenheim: Conchbooks. viii + 361 pp. [29 February 2012] page(s): 131

External links

supertexta
Gastropods described in 1870